An ignition system generates a spark or heats an electrode to a high temperature to ignite a fuel-air mixture in spark ignition internal combustion engines, oil-fired and gas-fired boilers, rocket engines, etc. The widest application for spark ignition internal combustion engines is in petrol (gasoline) road vehicles such as cars and motorcycles.

Compression ignition Diesel engines ignite the fuel-air mixture by the heat of compression and do not need a spark. They usually have glowplugs that preheat the combustion chamber to aid starting in cold weather. Other engines may use a flame, or a heated tube, for ignition. While this was common for very early engines it is now rare.

The first electric spark ignition was probably Alessandro Volta's toy electric pistol from the 1780s.

Siegfried Marcus patented his "Electrical igniting device for gas engines" on 7 October 1884.

History

Magneto systems

The simplest form of spark ignition is that using a magneto. The engine spins a magnet inside a coil, or, in the earlier designs, a coil inside a fixed magnet, and also operates a contact breaker, interrupting the current and causing the voltage to be increased sufficiently to jump a small gap. The spark plugs are connected directly from the magneto output. Early magnetos had one coil, with the contact breaker (sparking plug) inside the combustion chamber. In about 1902, Bosch introduced a double-coil magneto, with a fixed sparking plug, and the contact breaker outside the cylinder. Magnetos are not used in modern cars, but because they generate their own electricity they are often found on small engines such as those found in mopeds, lawnmowers, snowblowers, chainsaws, etc. where a battery-based electrical system is not present for any combination of necessity, weight, cost, and reliability reasons. They are also used on piston-engined aircraft engines. Although an electrical supply is available, magneto systems are used mainly because of their higher reliability.

Magnetos were used on the small engine's ancestor, the stationary "hit and miss" engine which was used in the early twentieth century, on older gasoline or distillate farm tractors before battery starting and lighting became common, and on aircraft piston engines. Magnetos were used in these engines because their simplicity and self-contained operation was more reliable, and because magnetos weighed less than having a battery and dynamo or alternator.

Aircraft engines usually have dual magnetos to provide redundancy in the event of a failure, and to increase efficiency by thoroughly and quickly burning the fuel air mix from both sides towards the center. The Wright brothers used a magneto invented in 1902 and built for them in 1903 by Dayton, Ohio inventor, Vincent Groby Apple. Some older automobiles had both a magneto system and a battery actuated system (see below) running simultaneously to ensure proper ignition under all conditions with the limited performance each system provided at the time. This gave the benefits of easy starting (from the battery system) with reliable sparking at speed (from the magneto).

Many modern magneto systems (except for small engines) have removed the second (high voltage) coil from the magneto itself and placed it in an external coil assembly similar to the ignition coil described below. In this development, the induced current in the coil in the magneto also flows through the primary of the external coil, generating a high voltage in the secondary as a result. Such a system is referred to as an 'energy transfer system'. Energy transfer systems provide the ultimate in ignition reliability.

Switchable systems

The output of a magneto depends on the speed of the engine, and therefore starting can be problematic. Some magnetos include an impulse system, which spins the magnet quickly at the proper moment, making easier starting at slow cranking speeds. Some engines, such as aircraft but also the Ford Model T, used a system which relied on non rechargeable dry cells, (similar to a large flashlight battery, and which was not maintained by a charging system as on modern automobiles) to start the engine or for starting and running at low speed. The operator would manually switch the ignition over to magneto operation for high speed operation.

To provide high voltage for the spark from the low voltage batteries, a 'tickler' was used, which was essentially a larger version of the once widespread electric buzzer. With this apparatus, the direct current passes through an electromagnetic coil which pulls open a pair of contact points, interrupting the current; the magnetic field collapses, the spring-loaded points close again, the circuit is reestablished, and the cycle repeats rapidly. The rapidly collapsing magnetic field, however, induces a high voltage across the coil which can only relieve itself by arcing across the contact points; while in the case of the buzzer this is a problem as it causes the points to oxidize and/or weld together, in the case of the ignition system this becomes the source of the high voltage to operate the spark plugs.

In this mode of operation, the coil would "buzz" continuously, producing a constant train of sparks. The entire apparatus was known as the 'Model T spark coil' (in contrast to the modern ignition coil which is only the actual coil component of the system). Long after the demise of the Model T as transportation they remained a popular self-contained source of high voltage for electrical home experimenters, appearing in articles in magazines such as Popular Mechanics and projects for school science fairs as late as the early 1960s. In the UK these devices were commonly known as trembler coils and were popular in cars pre-1910, and also in commercial vehicles with large engines until around 1925 to ease starting.

The Model T magneto (built into the flywheel) differed from modern implementations by not providing high voltage directly at the output; the maximum voltage produced was about 30 volts, and therefore also had to be run through the spark coil to provide high enough voltage for ignition, as described above, although the coil would not "buzz" continuously in this case, only going through one cycle per spark. In either case, the low voltage was switched to the appropriate spark plug by the timer mounted on the front of the engine. This performed the equivalent function to the modern distributor, although by directing the low voltage, not the high voltage as for the distributor. The ignition timing was adjustable by rotating this mechanism through a lever mounted on the steering column. As the precise timing of the spark depends on both the 'timer' and the trembler contacts within the coil, this is less consistent than the breaker points of the later distributor. However, for the low speed and the low compression of such early engines, this imprecise timing was acceptable.

Battery and coil-operated ignition

With the universal adoption of electrical starting for automobiles, and the availability of a large battery to provide a constant source of electricity, magneto systems were abandoned for systems which interrupted current at battery voltage, using an ignition coil to step the voltage up to the needs of the ignition, and a distributor to route the ensuing pulse to the correct spark plug at the correct time.

The Benz Patent-Motorwagen and the Ford Model T used a trembler coil ignition system. A trembler coil was a battery-powered induction coil; the trembler interrupted the current through the coil and caused a quick series of sparks during each firing. The trembler coil would be energized at an appropriate point in the engine cycle. In the Model T, the four-cylinder engine had a trembler coil for each cylinder; a commutator (timer case) delivered power to the trembler coils. The Model T would be started on battery but then switched to a magneto.

An improved ignition system was developed by the Dayton Engineering Laboratories Co. (Delco) and introduced in the 1912 Cadillac. This ignition was developed by Charles Kettering and was a wonder in its day. It consisted of a single ignition coil, breaker points (the switch), a capacitor (to prevent the points from arcing at break) and a distributor (to direct the electricity from the ignition coil to the correct cylinder).

The points allow the coil magnetic field to build. When the points open by a cam arrangement, the magnetic field collapses inducing an EMF in the primary that is much larger than the battery voltage and the transformer action produces a high output voltage (20 kV or higher) from the secondary.

The capacitor suppresses arcing at the points when they open; without the capacitor, the energy stored in the coil would be expended at an arc across the points rather than at the spark plug gap. The Kettering system became the primary ignition system for many years in the automotive industry due to its lower cost, and relative simplicity.

Modern ignition systems 
The ignition system is typically controlled by a key operated Ignition switch.

Mechanically timed ignition

Most four-stroke engines have used a mechanically timed electrical ignition system. The heart of the system is the distributor. The distributor contains a rotating cam driven by the engine's drive, a set of breaker points, a condenser, a rotor and a distributor cap. External to the distributor is the ignition coil, the spark plugs and wires linking the distributor to the spark plugs and ignition coil. (see diagram Below)

The system is powered by a lead-acid battery, which is charged by the car's electrical system using a dynamo or alternator. The engine operates contact breaker points, which interrupt the current to an induction coil (known as the ignition coil).

The ignition coil consists of two transformer windings — the primary and secondary. These windings share a common magnetic core. An alternating current in the primary induces an alternating magnetic field in the core and hence an alternating current in the secondary. The ignition coil's secondary has more turns than the primary. This is a step-up transformer, which produces a high voltage from the secondary winding. The primary winding is connected to the battery (usually through a current-limiting ballast resistor). Inside the ignition coil one end of each winding is connected together. This common point is taken to the capacitor/contact breaker junction. The other, high voltage, end of the secondary is connected to the distributor's rotor.

The ignition firing sequence begins with the points (or contact breaker) closed. A steady current flows from the battery, through the current-limiting resistor, through the primary coil, through the closed breaker points and finally back to the battery. This current produces a magnetic field within the coil's core. This magnetic field forms the energy reservoir that will be used to drive the ignition spark.

As the engine crankshaft turns, it also turns the distributor shaft at half the speed. In a four-stroke engine, the crankshaft turns twice for the ignition cycle. A multi-lobed cam is attached to the distributor shaft; there is one lobe for each engine cylinder. A spring-loaded rubbing block follows the lobed portions of the cam contour and controls the opening and closing of points. During most of the cycle, the rubbing block keeps the points closed to allow a current to build in the ignition coil's primary winding. As a piston reaches the top of the engine's compression cycle, the cam's lobe is high enough to cause the breaker points to open. Opening the points causes the current through the primary coil to stop. Without the steady current through the primary, the magnetic field generated in the coil immediately collapses. This high rate of change of magnetic flux induces a high voltage in the coil's secondary windings that ultimately causes the spark plug's gap to arc and ignite the fuel.

The spark generation story is a little more complicated. The purpose of the ignition coil is to make a spark that jumps the spark plug's gap, which might be  (it also has to jump the rotor-to-distributor-post gap). Something must be done to prevent the points from arcing as they separate; if the points arc, then they will drain the magnetic energy that was intended for the spark plug. The capacitor (condenser) performs that task. The capacitor temporarily keeps the primary current flowing so the voltage across the points is below the point's arcing voltage. There is a race: the voltage across the points is increasing as the primary current charges the capacitor, but at the same time the points' separation (and consequent arcing voltage) is increasing.

In addition to staying below the arcing voltage, the ignition system keeps the voltage across the points below the breakdown voltage for an air gap to prevent a glow discharge across the points. Such a glow discharge would quickly transition to an arc, and the arc would prevent the spark plug from firing. The minimum voltage for a glow discharge in air is about 320 V. Consequently, the capacitor value is chosen to also keep the voltage across the points to be less than 320 V. Keeping the points from arcing when they separate is the reason the ignition coil includes a secondary winding rather than using just a simple inductor. If the transformer has a 100:1 ratio, then the secondary voltage can reach 30 kV.

The ignition coil's high voltage output is connected to the rotor that sits on top of the distributor shaft. Surrounding the rotor is the distributor cap. The arrangement sequentially directs the output of the secondary winding to the appropriate spark plugs. The high voltage from the coil's secondary (typically 20,000 to 50,000 volts) causes a spark to form across the gap of the spark plug that in turn ignites the compressed air-fuel mixture within the engine. It is the creation of this spark which consumes the energy that was stored in the ignition coil's magnetic field.

The flat twin cylinder 1948 Citroën 2CV used one double ended coil without a distributor, and just contact breakers, in a wasted spark system.

Some two-cylinder motorcycles and motor scooters had two contact points feeding twin coils each connected directly to one of the two sparking plugs without a distributor; e.g. the BSA Thunderbolt and Triumph Tigress.

High performance engines with eight or more cylinders that operate at high r.p.m. (such as those used in motor racing) demand both a higher rate of spark and a higher spark energy than the simple ignition circuit can provide. This problem is overcome by using either of these adaptations:
 Two complete sets of coils, breakers and condensers can be provided - one set for each half of the engine, which is typically arranged in V-8 or V-12 configuration. Although the two ignition system halves are electrically independent, they typically share a single distributor which in this case contains two breakers driven by the rotating cam, and a rotor with two isolated conducting planes for the two high voltage inputs.
 A single breaker driven by a cam and a return spring is limited in spark rate by the onset of contact bounce or float at high rpm. This limit can be overcome by substituting for the breaker a 'pair of breakers' (aka "dual points") that are connected electrically in parallel but spaced on opposite sides of the cam so they are driven out of phase. Each breaker then switches current flow at half the rate of a single breaker and the "dwell" time for current buildup in the coil is maximized since it is shared between the breakers, one contact set being the "make" pair and the second being the "break" pair. The Lamborghini V-8 engine has both these adaptations and therefore uses two ignition coils and a single distributor that contains 4 contact breakers.

A distributor-based system is not greatly different from a magneto system except that more separate elements are involved. There are also advantages to this arrangement. For example, the position of the contact breaker points relative to the engine angle can be changed a small amount dynamically, allowing the ignition timing to be automatically advanced with increasing revolutions per minute (RPM) or increased manifold vacuum, giving better efficiency and performance.

However it is necessary to check periodically the maximum opening gap of the breaker(s), using a feeler gauge, since this mechanical adjustment affects the "dwell" time during which the coil charges, and breakers should be re-dressed or replaced when they have become pitted by electric arcing. This system was used almost universally until the 1972, when electronic ignition systems started to appear.

Electronic ignition
The disadvantage of the mechanical system is the use of breaker points to interrupt the low-voltage high-current through the primary winding of the coil; the points are subject to mechanical wear where they ride the cam to open and shut, as well as oxidation and burning at the contact surfaces from the constant sparking. They require regular adjustment to compensate for wear, and the opening of the contact breakers, which is responsible for spark timing, is subject to mechanical variations.

In addition, the spark voltage is also dependent on contact effectiveness, and poor sparking can lead to lower engine efficiency. A mechanical contact breaker system cannot control an average ignition current of more than about 3 A while still giving a reasonable service life, and this may limit the power of the spark and ultimate engine speed.

Electronic ignition (EI) solves these problems. In the initial systems, points were still used but they handled only a low current which was used to control the high primary current through a solid state switching system. Soon, however, even these contact breaker points were replaced by an angular sensor of some kind - either optical, where a vaned rotor breaks a light beam, or more commonly using a Hall effect sensor, which responds to a rotating magnet mounted on the distributor shaft. The sensor output is shaped and processed by suitable circuitry, then used to trigger a switching device such as a thyristor, which switches a large current through the coil.

The first electronic ignition (a cold cathode type) was tested in 1948 by Delco-Remy, while Lucas introduced a transistorized ignition in 1955, which was used on BRM and Coventry Climax Formula One engines in 1962. The aftermarket began offering EI that year, with both the AutoLite Electric Transistor 201 and Tung-Sol EI-4 (thyratron capacitive discharge) being available. Pontiac became the first automaker to offer an optional EI, the breakerless magnetic pulse-triggered Delcotronic, on some 1963 models; it was also available on some Corvettes. The first commercially available all solid-state (SCR) capacitive discharge ignition was manufactured by Hyland Electronics in Canada also in 1963. Ford fitted a FORD designed breakerless system on the Lotus 25s entered at Indianapolis the next year, ran a fleet test in 1964, and began offering optional EI on some models in 1965. This electronic system was utilized on the GT40s campaigned by Shelby American and Holman and Moody.  Robert C. Hogle, Ford Motor Company, presented the, "Mark II-GT Ignition and Electrical System", Publication #670068, at the SAE Congress, Detroit, Michigan, January 9–13, 1967.  Beginning in 1958, Earl W. Meyer at Chrysler worked on EI, continuing until 1961 and resulting in use of EI on the company's NASCAR hemis in 1963 and 1964.

Prest-O-Lite's CD-65, which relied on capacitance discharge (CD), appeared in 1965, and had "an unprecedented 50,000 mile warranty." (This differs from the non-CD Prest-O-Lite system introduced on AMC products in 1972, and made standard equipment for the 1975 model year.) A similar CD unit was available from Delco in 1966, which was optional on Oldsmobile, Pontiac, and GMC vehicles in the 1967 model year. Also in 1967, Motorola debuted their breakerless CD system. The most famous aftermarket electronic ignition which debuted in 1965, was the Delta Mark 10 capacitive discharge ignition, which was sold assembled or as a kit.

The Fiat Dino was the first production car to come standard with EI in 1968, followed by the Jaguar XJ Series 1 in 1971, Chrysler (after a 1971 trial) in 1973 and by Ford and GM in 1975.

In 1967, Prest-O-Lite made a "Black Box" ignition amplifier, intended to take the load off the distributor's breaker points during high rpm runs, which was used by Dodge and Plymouth on their factory Super Stock Coronet and Belvedere drag racers. This amplifier was installed on the interior side of the cars' firewall, and had a duct which provided outside air to cool the unit. The rest of the system (distributor and spark plugs) remains as for the mechanical system. The lack of moving parts compared with the mechanical system leads to greater reliability and longer service intervals.

Chrysler introduced breakerless ignition in mid-1971 as an option for its 340 V8 and the 426 Street Hemi. Breakerless ignition was standardised across the model range for 1973.

For older cars, it is usually possible to retrofit an EI system in place of the mechanical one. In some cases, a modern distributor will fit into the older engine with no other modifications, like the H.E.I. distributor made by General Motors, the Hot-Spark electronic ignition conversion kit, and the Chrysler breakerless system.

Other innovations are currently available on various cars. In some models, rather than one central coil, there are individual coils on each spark plug, sometimes known as direct ignition or coil on plug (COP). This allows the coil a longer time to accumulate a charge between sparks, and therefore a higher energy spark. A variation on this has each coil handle two plugs, on cylinders which are 360 degrees out of phase (and therefore reach top dead center (TDC) at the same time); in the four-cycle engine this means that one plug will be sparking during the end of the exhaust stroke while the other fires at the usual time, a so-called "wasted spark" arrangement which has no drawbacks apart from faster spark plug erosion; the paired cylinders are 1/4 and 2/3 on four cylinder arrangements, 1/4, 6/3, 2/5 on six cylinder engines and 6/7, 4/1, 8/3 and 2/5 on V8 engines. Other systems do away with the distributor as a timing apparatus and use a magnetic crank angle sensor mounted on the crankshaft to trigger the ignition at the proper time.

Digital electronic ignitions
At the turn of the 21st century digital electronic ignition modules became available for small engines on such applications as chainsaws, string trimmers, leaf blowers, and lawn mowers. This was made possible by low cost, high speed, and small footprint microcontrollers. Digital electronic ignition modules can be designed as either capacitor discharge ignition (CDI) or inductive discharge ignition (IDI) systems. Capacitive discharge digital ignitions store charged energy for the spark in a capacitor within the module that can be released to the spark plug at virtually any time throughout the engine cycle via a control signal from the microprocessor. This allows for greater timing flexibility, and engine performance; especially when designed hand-in-hand with the engine carburetor.

Engine management 
In an Engine Management System (EMS), electronics control fuel delivery and ignition timing. Primary sensors on the system are crankshaft angle (crankshaft or TDC position), airflow into the engine and throttle position. The circuitry determines which cylinder needs fuel and how much, opens the requisite injector to deliver it, then causes a spark at the right moment to burn it. Early EMS systems used an analogue computer to accomplish this, but as embedded systems dropped in price and became fast enough to keep up with the changing inputs at high revolutions, digital systems started to appear.

Some designs using an EMS retain the original ignition coil, distributor and high-tension leads found on cars throughout history. Other systems dispense with the distributor altogether and have individual coils mounted directly atop each spark plug. This removes the need for both distributor and high-tension leads, which reduces maintenance and increases long-term reliability.

Modern EMSs read in data from various sensors about the crankshaft position, intake manifold temperature, intake manifold pressure (or intake air volume), throttle position, fuel mixture via the oxygen sensor, detonation via a knock sensor, and exhaust gas temperature sensors. The EMS then uses the collected data to precisely determine how much fuel to deliver and when and how far to advance the ignition timing. With electronic ignition systems, individual cylinders can have their own individual timing so that timing can be as aggressive as possible per cylinder without fuel detonation. As a result, sophisticated electronic ignition systems can be both more fuel efficient, and produce better performance over their counterparts.

Turbine, jet and rocket engines 
Gas turbine engines, including jet engines, have a CDI system using one or more igniter plugs, which are only used at startup or in case the combustor(s) flame goes out.

Rocket engine ignition systems are especially critical. If prompt ignition does not occur, the combustion chamber can fill with excess fuel and oxidiser and significant overpressure can occur (a "hard start") or even an explosion. Rockets often employ pyrotechnic devices that place flames across the face of the injector plate, or, alternatively, hypergolic propellants that ignite spontaneously on contact with each other. The latter types of engines do away with ignition systems entirely and cannot experience hard starts, but the propellants are highly toxic and corrosive. SpaceX's Raptor engine used for Starship and Super Heavy and the RS-25 engine used as the Space Shuttle Main Engine (SSME) used spark-ignition system. The Raptor engine needed to use spark-ignition because astronauts can't make pyrotechnic ignition systems or refill hypergolic fuel supply on the Moon or Mars, because the Lunar and Martian resources are very different from the resources of Earth.

See also 
 Electromagnetism
 Faraday's law of induction
 Saab Direct Ignition
 Spark-ignition

References

External links

Ignition apparatus for explosion-motors. Charles F. Kettering 15 September 1909/3 September 1912 "Ignition Apparatus for Explosion-Motors" no capacitor, no points, separate coils
Ignition system. Charles F. Kettering 2 November 1910/3 September 1912 "Ignition System" distributor with capacitor 46 (not points)
Ignition system. Charles F. Kettering 11 August 1911/17 April 1917 "Ignition System" points, no capacitor, ignition switch to avoid draining the battery
Ignition system John A. Hawthorne 1964/1967 comments about Kettering ignition system: "Practical efforts to improve or supplant this system have failed, and it has remained virtually unchanged through the years. However, the present trend toward higher performance automobile engines threatens to render this tried and true system obsolete. The principal limitation of the Kettering system is, as typically applied, the inability to develop adequate levels of spark plug gap energy without sacrificing longevity of the ignition points or the transformer coil. The inherent inefficiency of the system is particularly apparent at higher engine speeds."

 
Auto parts
Applications of control engineering
Engine components